Thomas William Simpson (born 1877) was an English professional golfer. He has two top-10 finishes in The Open Championship, in 1905 and 1908.

Early life
Simpson was born in Cayton, near Scarborough, Yorkshire in 1879. He learnt his golf at Ganton Golf Club where Harry Vardon was the professional. Simpson had two younger brothers, Harry and Amos, who were also professional golfers.

Golf career
Simpson was at Wakefield Golf Club from about 1900 and then at Timperley Golf Club from 1902 before moving to Lytham & St Annes Golf Club in early 1905. Simpson was at Lytham until 1919 when he moved to Hesketh Golf Club where he remained until at least 1926.

Simpson first entered The Open Championship in 1900. He scored 84 and 86 on the first day to make the cut and finished in a tie for 14th place. He played again in 1901, missing the cut by 2 strokes, and in 1902 where he missed the cut by 7 strokes. In 1903 Simpson qualified for the final stages of the first News of the World Match Play, taking one of the five paces allocated to the Northern Section of the P.G.A. He met J. H. Taylor in the first round, losing 3 & 1. He qualified again the following year, losing to Alfred Toogood at the last-16 stage.

After moving to Lytham, he entered the 1905 Open Championship. He had an 88 on the second day but still made the cut. Final-day rounds of  78 and 81 lifted him into a tie for 9th place. In 1906 he finished tied for 15th in the Open Championship and he was third in the Leeds Cup. Qualifying was introduced for the 1907 Open. Simpson entered but failed to qualify. Simpson entered again in 1908 and qualified with two rounds of 81. In the Championship itself, he had rounds of 75-77-76-79 to  finish in a tie for seventh place. Simpson failed to qualify for the 1909 Open but he did reach the final stage of the 1909 News of the World Match Play, after finishing joint runner-up in the northern section qualifying event. He lost to Charles Mayo in the first round of the final stage.

Simpson was a well known golf architect.  The Tom Simpson Society is formed as tribute to his design prowess. Simpson expressed interest in design by writing a letter to Golf Illustrated in 1908 followed by joining Herbert Fowler's design company in 1910.  In 1929, Simpson co-authored The Architectural Side of Golf
Quote: Now in golf course design, the obvious thing is almost invariably the wrong thing.

Golf Courses (Original Design)
Cruden Bay, Scotland
Golf de Chantilly, France
Golf de Chiberta, France
Golf de Hardelot, France
Golf de Fontainebleau, France
Golf de Morfontaine, France
Royal Antwerp, Belgium
Royal Madrid Golf Course, Spain
Sart-Tilman, Germany

Golf Courses (Renovation)
Ashridge Golf Club, England
Ballybunion, Ireland
County Louth Baltray, Ireland
Honourable Company of Edinburgh (Muirfield), Scotland
Liphook Golf Club, England
New Zealand Golf Club, England
Real Club de la Puerto de Hierro Golf Club, Spain
Royal Porthcawl Golf Club, Wales
Rye Golf Club, England
St. Enodoc, England
Woking Golf Club, England

Results in major championships

Note: Simpson only played in The Open Championship.

CUT = missed the half-way cut
"T" indicates a tie for a place

References

English male golfers
Sportspeople from Scarborough, North Yorkshire
1877 births
Date of death unknown